Khaled Nimr (born January 1, 1978) is a Jordanian footballer, of Palestinian origin, who plays as a midfielder for Al-Jazeera (Amman).

References
 Khaled Nimr: "And So, That's How I Transferred to Al-Wahdat SC"

External links 
 
 

1978 births
Association football midfielders
Jordanian footballers
Jordan international footballers
Sportspeople from Amman
Living people